Michael Obst (born 22 June 1944) is a German rower who competed for the United Team of Germany in the 1960 Summer Olympics.

He was born in Leipzig. At the 1959 European Rowing Championships in Mâcon, he won gold with the coxed four. In 1960 he was the coxswain of the German boat which won the gold medal in the coxed four event.

References

1944 births
Living people
Coxswains (rowing)
Olympic rowers of the United Team of Germany
Rowers at the 1960 Summer Olympics
Olympic gold medalists for the United Team of Germany
Sportspeople from Leipzig
Olympic medalists in rowing
German male rowers
Medalists at the 1960 Summer Olympics
European Rowing Championships medalists